Nidema is a genus of flowering plants from the orchid family, Orchidaceae. It contains two known species, both native to the tropical Western Hemisphere.

Species

See also 
 List of Orchidaceae genera

References 

 Pridgeon, A.M., Cribb, P.J., Chase, M.A. & Rasmussen, F. eds. (1999). Genera Orchidacearum 1. Oxford Univ. Press.
 Pridgeon, A.M., Cribb, P.J., Chase, M.A. & Rasmussen, F. eds. (2001). Genera Orchidacearum 2. Oxford Univ. Press.
 Pridgeon, A.M., Cribb, P.J., Chase, M.A. & Rasmussen, F. eds. (2003). Genera Orchidacearum 3. Oxford Univ. Press
 Berg Pana, H. 2005. Handbuch der Orchideen-Namen. Dictionary of Orchid Names. Dizionario dei nomi delle orchidee. Ulmer, Stuttgart

External links 
IOSPE orchid photos, Nidema boothii
Asociación Salvadoreña de Orquideología, Nidema boothii
Orquídeas de Honduras, Nidema boothii

Laeliinae
Laeliinae genera